Jamie Thomas is an American skateboarder.

Jamie Thomas may also refer to:

Jamie Thomas (footballer, born 1985), Antiguan international footballer
Jamie Thomas (soccer, born 1992), American soccer player
Jamie Thomas (footballer, born 1997), English-born Welsh footballer
Jamie Thomas (poet), author of the poetry collection Etch and Blur 
"Jamie Thomas", a song by Graham Coxon from his album The Golden D

See also
Jaimie Thomas (born 1986), American football player
James Thomas (disambiguation)